At the Edge of the Beginning is the first solo album by Israeli musician Idan Raichel. It was released on 12 March 2015 by Helicon and Cumbancha records.

Background
All tracks are written and produced by Idan Raichel. "Circles" and "In Five Seconds" were produced in collaboration with Israeli drummer Gilad Shmueli. The track "Longing" is sung by Israeli singer Dana Zalah.

The album was certified gold even before being released. In 2018, it was certified platinum.

The album peaked at number three on Billboards Top World Music Albums chart.

Track listing

Charts

Certifications

References

2015 albums
Idan Raichel albums
Helicon Records albums
Cumbancha albums